Leones may refer to:

 Colegio Los Leones de Quilpué, basketball team from Chile
 Sierra Leonean Leone, currency of Sierra Leone
 Leones (football team), from El Salvador
 , a city in Marcos Juárez Department, Córdoba Province, Argentina
 Leones, Herrera, corregimiento in Panama
 Leones, Veraguas, corregimiento in Panama
 Aerfer Leone, undeveloped fighter aircraft
 Subaru Leone, subcompact car
 Carea Leonés, Spanish breed dog
 Leonese language, a language from the Iberian Peninsula
 Leonese people, the inhabitants of León whose homeland is the former Kingdom of León